Lavagno is a comune (municipality) in the Province of Verona in the Italian region Veneto, located about  west of Venice and about  east of Verona.

The municipality of Lavagno is formed by the frazioni (subdivisions, mainly villages and hamlets) San Briccio, San  Pietro (municipal seat), Turano and Vago.

Lavagno borders the following municipalities: Caldiero, Colognola ai Colli, Illasi, Mezzane di Sotto, and San Martino Buon Albergo.

References

External links
Official website
 www.lavagno.it/

Cities and towns in Veneto